Iridomyrmex chasei is an ant belonging to the genus Iridomyrmex. The species was described by Forel in 1902, the species is mainly abundant nationwide in Australia, with an exception of its presence in Tasmania. This species is widely known for its large and highly populated nests.

References

Iridomyrmex
Hymenoptera of Australia
Insects described in 1902